Bieberbach may refer to:

Ludwig Bieberbach, German mathematician
Bieberbach (Egloffstein), a village in the municipality Egloffstein, Bavaria, Germany
Bieberbach (Feuchtwangen), a village in the municipality Feuchtwangen, Bavaria, Germany
Bieberbach (Sonnefeld), a village in the municipality Sonnefeld, Bavaria, Germany
Bieberbach (Hönne), a river in North Rhine-Westphalia, Germany